Anja Karen Blacha (born 18 June 1990) is a German mountaineer. Blacha holds a number of climbing records: in 2017, she became the youngest German woman to successfully climb Mount Everest and the youngest German overall to climb all Seven Summits and in 2019 she became the first German woman to climb K2.

In 2020, she set the record for the longest solo, unsupported, and unassisted polar expedition by any woman in history, having skied for almost 1,400 km from Berkner Island to the South Pole. This journey also makes her the youngest woman ever to reach the South Pole in this style.

She has a track record of 100% first time success, and, being a full-time business professional, has been almost entirely self-funded on her expeditions.

Personal life 
Blacha grew up in Bielefeld, Germany and lived and worked in London, UK before moving to Zurich, Switzerland in 2016. She is working in the telecommunications industry. She holds a Bachelor's degree in Business Administration from University of Mannheim with studies at UC Berkeley and Korea University, as well as a Master's degree in Philosophy from Birkbeck, University of London.

She has been a long-time athlete in fencing. In 2012, she was awarded Sportswoman of the year by the University of London.

In 2017, Zeit Campus named her one of "18 for 18", a feature of 18 people under age 30 who are having an impact in Germany.

Expeditions

Seven Summits 
Anja Blacha first started mountaineering in 2015 when she climbed Aconcagua. She then continued to climb all Seven Summits, scaling the highest mountain on each continent with 100% first-time success in just under three years. At age 26, she became the youngest German woman to summit Mount Everest which she climbed via the North route from Tibet. Later that year, at age 27, she became the youngest German to complete all Seven Summits.

K2 expedition 
In summer 2019, she embarked on a double expedition in Pakistan to climb Broad Peak and K2 in the same season. As part of the acclimatisation for K2, she first summited Broad Peak, the world's 12th highest mountain at 8,047 m, on July 4. Thereafter, she summited K2, the world's 2nd highest mountain at 8,611 m, on July 25, ascending via the Abruzzi Spur, descending via the Cesen route. She reached both summits without the use of supplemental oxygen.

She is the first German woman to have summited K2 and the 8th German overall.

Southern Solitaire 

On 9 January 2020, she reached the South Pole after having skied for 57 days, 18 hours, and 50 minutes from the Northern end of Berkner Island to the South Pole. She has started further North on Berkner Island than any other expedition before her, and set the record for the longest solo, unsupported, and unassisted polar expedition by any woman to date. She has also become the youngest woman ever to ski solo, unsupported, and unassisted to the South Pole on any route.

Only five people in history have accomplished a journey from Berkner Island to the South Pole solo, unsupported, and unassisted before her. Amongst these are polar explorers Børge Ousland, Ben Saunders, and Henry Worsley who died shortly after being evacuated on a later part of his expedition.

INTERSPORT has supported this expedition, and together they launched the campaign “Not bad for a girl” to inspire and encourage people to look beyond stereotypes.

Other trips and expeditions 

 Mont Blanc, 4,808 m, 2015
 Dufourspitze, 4,634 m, 2017
 Großglockner, 3,798 m, 2017

 Matterhorn, 4,478 m, 2018
 Greenland, crossing West to East, 2019

Upcoming projects

North Pole 
She will ski to the North Pole in Spring 2021.

Weblinks 
Official Website

Anja Blacha on Instagram

References 

German mountain climbers

1990 births
Living people
University of Mannheim alumni
Female polar explorers